I'm Not Rappaport is a 1996 American buddy dramedy film written and directed by Herb Gardner, starring Walter Matthau and Ossie Davis. Based on Gardner's play of the same name, the film focuses on two elderly New York City men – Nat Moyer, a cantankerous left-wing Jew, and Midge Carter, an African-American man – who spend their days sitting on a bench in Central Park, trying to mask the realities of aging, mainly through the tall tales that Nat spins.

The film touches on several issues, including society's treatment of the aged, the difficulties dealing with adult children who think they know what's best for their parents, and the dangers that lurk in urban areas. Its title comes from an old vaudeville joke, a variation of which evolved into dialogue between the two protagonists.

Plot
In the park every morning, elderly, half-blind Midge Carter tries to read his newspaper, but is distracted daily by Nat Moyer, an opinionated old man who reminisces about long-ago union, socialist/communist activities and the love of his life.

Midge is superintendent of a residential building and has been trying to steer clear of a tenant, Pete Danforth, whose committee is pushing for Midge's retirement. Nat insists that Midge stand up for his rights, going so far as to pass himself off as Midge's attorney.

Nat's married daughter, Clara, is concerned about his welfare, particularly given how vulnerable a senior citizen can be in the park. She has good reason to worry because Nat encounters the Cowboy, a drug dealer who is owed money by a young woman named Laurie, and by J.C., a mugger who turns violent when Nat unwisely decides to fight back.

Cast
 Walter Matthau as Nat Moyer
 Ossie Davis as Midge Carter
 Amy Irving as Clara Gelber
 Craig T. Nelson as the Cowboy
 Martha Plimpton as Laurie Campbell
 Boyd Gaines as Pete Danforth
 Ron Rifkin as Feigenbaum
 Guillermo Diaz as J.C.

Reception

Roger Ebert, who gave the film 2 and a half stars out of 4, felt that the film diverged too far from the play, writing that "if they'd stayed on the bench and just talked--talked for two solid hours--it might have been more successful. Instead, writer-director Herb Gardner loses faith in his original impulse and adds plot--way too much plot--to force the movie into more conventional channels." USA Today critic Andy Seiler wrote that "director Herb Gardner is a little too fond of writer Herb Gardner's script, which just keeps going and going and going -- until even two old pros such as Walter and Ossie have worn out their welcome."

References

External links
 
 

1990s American films
1990s buddy comedy-drama films
1990s English-language films
1996 films
1996 comedy films
1996 drama films
American buddy comedy-drama films
American films based on plays
Films about disability
Films about old age
Films scored by Gerry Mulligan
Films set in New York City
Films shot in New York City
Gramercy Pictures films